This is the discography of American singer and musician Al Jarreau.

Albums

Studio albums

Live albums

Compilation albums

Singles

Other

Soundtrack inclusions
1982: "Girls Know How", in the film Night Shift (Warner Bros)
1984: "Moonlighting (theme)" and "Since I Fell for You", in the television show Moonlighting (Universal)
1984: "Boogie Down", in the film Breakin' (Warner Bros)
1984: "Million Dollar Baby", in the film City Heat (Warner Bros)
1986: "The Music of Goodbye", duet with Melissa Manchester, in the film Out of Africa (MCA Records)
1989: "Never Explain Love", in the film Do the Right Thing (Motown)
1992: "Blue Skies", in the film Glengarry Glen Ross (New Line Cinema)
1992: "Heaven Is", in the film The Magic Voyage (Zweites Deutsches Fernsehen)
1998: "My Life and My Love", in the film The Secret of NIMH 2: Timmy to the Rescue (MGM)

Guest appearances
1974: "If I Ever Lose This Heaven" from Body Heat/Quincy Jones (A&M) (Jarreau provides background scat and vocal percussion.)
1978: "Hot News Blues" from Secret Agent/Chick Corea (Polydor)
1979: "Little Sunflower" from The Love Connection/Freddie Hubbard (Columbia)
1980: "One Good Turn" from In Harmony: A Sesame Street Record/Various Artists (Warner Bros.)
1982: "Your Precious Love (w/Randy Crawford)" from Casino Lights: Recorded Live At Montreux, Switzerland/Various Artists (Warner Bros.)
1983: "Bet Cha Say That to All the Girls" from Bet Cha Say That to All the Girls/Sister Sledge (Cotillion)
1984: "Edgartown Groove" from Send Me Your Love/Kashif (Arista)
1985: "We Are the World" from We Are the World/USA for Africa (Columbia) US No. 1, R&B No. 1 UK No. 1
1986: "Since I Fell for You" from Double Vision/Bob James & David Sanborn (Warner Bros.)
1987: "Day by Day" from City Rhythms/Shakatak
1989: "Somehow Our Love Survives" from Spellbound/Joe Sample (Warner Bros.)
1997: "Girl from Ipanema" and "Waters of March" from A Twist of Jobim/Lee Ritenour (GRP)
1997: "How Can I Help You Say Goodbye" from Doky Brothers 2/Chris Minh Doky and Niels Lan Doky (Blue Note Records)
1998: "Smile and Pierrot" with Gregor Prächt, David Benoit and the Hollywood Bowl Orchestra, arranged by George Duke
2000: "Happiness" from Here's to You, Charlie Brown: 50 Great Years!/David Benoit (GRP)
2006: "Take Five (w/Kurt Elling)" from Legends Of Jazz With Ramsey Lewis Showcase/Various Artists (LRS Media)
2009: "Whisper Not" from New Time, New Tet/Benny Golson (Concord Jazz)

References

Discographies of American artists
Rhythm and blues discographies
Soul music discographies
Pop music discographies